Thorpeness railway station served the seaside resort of Thorpeness in Suffolk.

It was opened in 1914 by the Great Eastern Railway on its  branch line from Saxmundham, and was closed in 1966 as part of the Beeching Axe.

 the platform of the former station survives, just north of the B1353 road nearly a mile west of the coast. But it is overgrown with vegetation, and the trackbed is now a footpath.

References

External links
 Thorpeness station on 1946 O. S. map

Disused railway stations in Suffolk
Former Great Eastern Railway stations
Beeching closures in England
Railway stations in Great Britain opened in 1914
Railway stations in Great Britain closed in 1966
1914 establishments in England